Peter Feteris (7 May 1952 – 14 February 2011) was a Dutch professional footballer who played as a winger.

Club career
Feteris made his professional debut for Feyenoord on 1 October 1972 against FC Den Bosch, and later played for Haarlem and FC Dordrecht. He also had a spell in Belgium with Union Saint-Gilloise and in France.

Later life and death
Feteris died on 14 February 2011, at the age of 58.

References

1952 births
2011 deaths
Footballers from Rotterdam
Association football wingers
Dutch footballers
Feyenoord players
HFC Haarlem players
Royale Union Saint-Gilloise players
FC Dordrecht players
ES Troyes AC players
Eredivisie players
Ligue 2 players
Dutch expatriate footballers
Expatriate footballers in Belgium
Expatriate footballers in France
Dutch expatriate sportspeople in Belgium
Dutch expatriate sportspeople in France